This is a list of episodes of the Japanese anime Our Home's Fox Deity produced by the animation studio Zexcs. The episodes are directed by Yoshiaki Iwasaki, written by Reiko Yoshida, and feature character designs by Yasunari Nitta, who based the designs on Eizō Hōden's original concept. The anime is based on the light novel series of the same name written by Jin Shibamura, and follows the story of Noboru Takagami and his younger brother Tōru who get protected by a kitsune and miko from Yōkai who are trying to kill the brothers.

The episodes began airing on April 6, 2008, and twenty-four episodes are planned for the series. Three pieces of theme music are used for the episodes; one opening theme and two ending themes. The opening theme, is performed by Yoshida Hitomi; the first ending theme, is performed by Saori Hayami; the second ending theme, is performed by Yukana, Saori Hayami, and Mikako Takahashi.

Episodes

References

External links
 Anime official website 

Our Home's Fox Deity